Jamaica competed at the 2022 World Athletics Championships in Eugene, United States, from 15 to 24 July 2022. The Jamaica Athletics Administrative Association entered 65 athletes.

On 17 July 2022, Jamaica achieved its first medal sweep at the World Athletics Championships after Shelly-Ann Fraser-Pryce, Shericka Jackson and Elaine Thompson-Herah won gold, silver and bronze, respectively in the women's 100 metres event. The three sprinters also came from sweeping the 100 metres event at the 2020 Summer Olympics in Tokyo.

With 2 gold, 7 silver and 1 bronze medals, Jamaica ended third in the medal table, but ranked second in the overall placing table with a total of 110 points, just behind the World Team Champions, the hosts United States.

Medalists

* – Indicates the athlete competed in preliminaries but not the final.

Team
On 1 July 2022, the Jamaica Athletics Administrative Association (JAAA) announced a 64-member team qualified for the World Athletics Championships, which included the American-born sprinter Andrew Hudson who was later dropped as ineligible. The final entry list published by World Athletics consigned 65 athletes for Jamaica, with Akeem Bloomfield being transferred from the 4 × 400 metres relay mixed team to the men's 200 metres event and being replaced by Demish Gaye and Rusheen McDonald.

The following athletes were part of the Jamaican team as alternates or reserves:
Men: Jelani Walker (100 metres) and Damion Thomas (110 metres hurdles).
Women: Briana Williams (100 metres), Natalliah Whyte (200 metres), Stacey-Ann Williams (400 metres), Demisha Roswell (100 metres hurdles) and Andrenette Knight (400 metres hurdles).

Men, women and mixed relay teams
The following were the original teams for the relay events that were announced in the final entry lists.

However, Javon Francis (men's 4 x 400), Rusheen McDonald and Gregory Prince (both in mixed 4 x 400) had no participation.

Oblique Seville was originally named in the quartet for the preliminaries of the men's 4 × 100 metres relay, however, he was pulled out due to physical discomforts and was replaced by Conroy Jones.

Results
Jamaica entered 65 athletes, but only 59 of them participated.

Men
Track events

* – Indicates the athlete competed in preliminaries but not the final.

Field events

Women
Track events

* – Indicates the athlete competed in preliminaries but not the final.

Field events

Mixed 

* – Indicates the athlete competed in preliminaries but not the final.

References

External links
Oregon22｜WCH 22｜World Athletics

Nations at the 2022 World Athletics Championships
Jamaica at the World Championships in Athletics
2022 in Jamaican sport